William Peets (born August 23, 1952) is a former boxer who represented the United States Virgin Islands. He competed in the men's middleweight event at the 1972 Summer Olympics. Peets also represented the United States Virgin Islands at the 1971 Pan American Games.

References

1952 births
Living people
Middleweight boxers
United States Virgin Islands male boxers
Olympic boxers of the United States Virgin Islands
Boxers at the 1972 Summer Olympics
Pan American Games competitors for the United States Virgin Islands
Boxers at the 1971 Pan American Games
Place of birth missing (living people)